
Duris (also Dūris, or Dûris, formally Doris and also known by its French spelling Douris) is a village located approximately . southwest of Baalbek in the Bekaa Valley, Lebanon. It is the site of a 13th-century Muslim shrine and a necropolis from the late Roman Imperial period that is currently undergoing archaeological investigation.

History
This site was found to contain both Shepherd Neolithic and Heavy Neolithic material together, being unusual in this respect. It was found by M. Billaux in 1957 who showed it to two archaeologists who were also members of the Society of Jesus, Henri Fleisch and Maurice Tallon. The Shepherd Neolithic material was unpatinated and appeared similar to that of Maakne. The larger pieces were patinated to white, appearing to represent different periods. Three Levallois flakes were found in 1966 by Lorraine Copeland.

The Qubbat Duris was built in AD 1243 ( 641) during the Ayyubid era. Its sarcophagus was raised or left standing to serve as a mihrab, helping to direct prayer towards Mecca. Its columns were probably removed from the ruins of nearby Baalbek and are assembled haphazardly, one being upside-down.

In 1838, Eli Smith noted  Duris  as a Sunni Muslim and Maronite village in the Baalbek District.

Gallery

See also
 Baalbek
 Temples of the Beqaa Valley

References

Bibliography

 .
 .
 .

External links
 Douris, Localiban 

Populated places in Baalbek District
Heavy Neolithic sites
Shepherd Neolithic sites
Neolithic settlements
Archaeological sites in Lebanon